The Ligerz Tunnel is a railway tunnel under construction at the southern foot of the Jura Railway line in Switzerland. The last single-track section of the southern Jura line is to be eliminated by the double-track tunnel. The planned costs amount to 431.9 million Swiss francs (470 million US dollars).

The tunnel is part of the STEP 2030 project and should be completed by December 2026. The tunnel will enable a continuous half-hourly service on the line.

It will run on the sea side and largely parallel to the existing road tunnel of Motorway number 5, which forms the Ligerz bypass.

The Twann station is to be modernized. The previous stop Ligerz will be removed and replaced by a bus line. This should open up the village of Ligerz and the Ligerz-Tessenberg railway from Twann, and an extension of the future bus line to La Neuveville is also under discussion.

The construction of the Ligerz Tunnel will be financed by the new Railway Infrastructure Fund (RIF), which Swiss voters accepted on February 9, 2014, with the FABI proposal.

References

External links 
 SBB project site 

Railway tunnels in Switzerland